This is the discography of Chamillionaire, an American rapper.

Albums

Studio albums

Collaborative albums

Compilation albums

Mixtapes

Extended plays

Singles

As lead artist

As featured artist

Promotional singles

Guest appearances

Music videos

Featured music videos

Notes 

A  "Hip Hop Police" did not enter the Billboard Hot 100, but peaked at number 1 on the Bubbling Under Hot 100 Singles chart, which acts as a 25-song extension to the Hot 100.
B  "Creepin' (Solo)" did not enter the Hot R&B/Hip-Hop Songs chart, but peaked at number 1 on the Bubbling Under R&B/Hip-Hop Singles chart, which acts as a 25-song extension to the R&B/Hip-Hop Songs chart.
C  "Not a Criminal" did not enter the Billboard Hot 100, but peaked at number 3 on the Bubbling Under Hot 100 Singles chart, which acts as a 25-song extension to the Hot 100. It did not enter the Hot R&B/Hip-Hop Songs chart, but peaked at number 5 on the Bubbling Under R&B/Hip-Hop Singles chart, which acts as a 25-song extension to the R&B/Hip-Hop Songs chart.

References

Hip hop discographies
Discographies of American artists